The American Chamber of Commerce in Japan (ACCJ, Zainichi Beikoku Shōkō Kaigisho) is a non-profit business organization consisting mainly of executives from American companies.  Currently, the ACCJ has over 3,000 members representing over 600 companies with chapters located in the Tokyo, Kansai and Chubu regions.  Working closely with the governments of the United States and Japan, business organizations and others, the ACCJ actively promotes activities that help achieve its mission of further developing commerce between the United States and Japan.

History

The  ACCJ was established in 1948 by representatives of 40 American companies. Originally, the ACCJ had six committees and nine board members.

The ACCJ claims to be Japan’s most influential foreign business organization, and serves as the primary forum for the foreign business community in Japan to identify and pursue shared interests and goals. There are more than sixty Chamber committees, subcommittees, task forces, and advisory councils that cover such diverse areas as: financial services, corporate social responsibility, marketing, independent business, healthcare services, e-business, transportation and logistics, legal services, the travel industry, and human resource management.

Programs

The ACCJ committees combined hold over 500 programs annually, and these events are exclusively attended by ACCJ members and their accompanied guests. The backbone of the annual agenda is hundreds of engagements with leading experts and shapers of policy and business trends in Japan. Speakers are drawn from the ranks of global business leaders, top U.S. and Japanese government officials, industry experts, scholars and pop culture icons. Former speakers Prime Minister of Japan, Shinzo Abe; JP Morgan Japan Director of Research, Jesper Koll; Rakuten Inc CEO, Hiroshi Mikitani; General Electric CEO, Jeffrey R. Immelt; U.S. Chamber of Commerce CEO, Tom J. Donohue; former Governor of California, Arnold Schwarzenegger; U.S. Department of Energy Secretary, Steven Chu; Transportation Secretary, Ray LaHood; Homeland Security Secretary, Janet Napolitano; U.S. Ambassador to Japan, Caroline Kennedy, and many others have chosen the ACCJ as their forum for addressing Japan’s international business community.

Advocacy

As a key stakeholder in the commercial relationship between the United States and Japan, the ACCJ works to influence the discussions that frame policy in both countries.  The ACCJ issues its official positions on policy issues in Viewpoint position papers, white papers, public comments and other reports.  The ultimate goal of these policy positions and the advocacy carried out to communicate them and promote their implementation is to further the mission of the ACCJ to improve the business environment in Japan for Chamber members.

ACCJ Board of Governors (as of 2021)

Leadership positions within the ACCJ are held by elected officials who represent top-level Japanese businesspeople and expats in Japan from the U.S. and around the globe.

References

External links
 The American Chamber of Commerce Japan (ACCJ) website
 The American Chamber of Commerce Japan (ACCJ) official Facebook page
 The American Chamber of Commerce Japan (ACCJ) official Twitter page
 The American Chamber of Commerce Japan (ACCJ) LinkedIn page
 The American Chamber of Commerce Japan (ACCJ) YouTube page

Non-profit organizations based in Japan
Foreign trade of Japan
American Chambers of commerce